Michalis Koussis (Greek: Μιχάλης Κούσης; 10 October 1953 – 24 May 2005) was a Greek Olympian Marathon and long-distance runner.

Koussis was born in 1953 in Agrinio in Aetolia-Acarnania, western Greece. He was an athlete of the Agrinio Gymnast Company (GEA) and a member of the Greece national team from 1971 to 1987.  He participated in the Olympic Games in 1976 and in 1984 and achieved many Panhellenic and Balkan records in marathon running.  He finished fourth in the 1980 Boston Marathon.  His greatest moment was the gold medal which he won in 1979, during the Mediterranean Games, in Split, in present-day Croatia, where he finished just slightly away from the world record.  In the same year, he was named the Greek Male Athlete of the Year. He ran for the 1982 European Championships Marathon.

Olympics
He was included in the Greece delegations in the  1976, 1980, and 1984 Summer Olympic Games.

He died in 2005, from heart problems, while training on a beach in Thessaloniki.

References

External links
Τα ΝΕΑ: Final goodbye for Michalis Koussis
Runningnews.gr - Michalis Koussis died

1953 births
2005 deaths
Sportspeople from Agrinio
Greek male long-distance runners
Greek male marathon runners
Olympic athletes of Greece
Athletes (track and field) at the 1976 Summer Olympics
Athletes (track and field) at the 1980 Summer Olympics
Athletes (track and field) at the 1984 Summer Olympics
Mediterranean Games gold medalists for Greece
Mediterranean Games medalists in athletics
Athletes (track and field) at the 1979 Mediterranean Games